Konstantin Kravchuk and Denys Molchanov were the defending champions but chose not to defend their title.

Igor Sijsling and Tim van Rijthoven won the title after defeating Diego Hidalgo and Sergio Martos Gornés 5–7, 7–6(7–4), [10–5] in the final.

Seeds

Draw

References

External links
 Main draw

Open de Tenis Ciudad de Pozoblanco - Doubles
2021 Doubles